Lophopoeum monticulum is a species of beetle in the family Cerambycidae. It was described by Monné and Martins in 1976.

References

Lophopoeum
Beetles described in 1976